Ozarkhed Dam is an earthfill dam on Unanda River near Dindori, Nashik district in the state of Maharashtra in India. It was constructed in Krishnagaon village which was later moved near Vani. The dam has a canal from which the water is released for irrigational purposes for the east region of  Nashik district.

Specifications

Purpose
Its water is used for various purposes for the Vani village and the other 30 villages of Chandwad taluka of Nashik district. It is also used for irrigational purposes for the nearby villages.

See also
 Dams in Maharashtra
 List of reservoirs and dams in India

References

Dams in Nashik district
Dams completed in 1982
1982 establishments in Maharashtra